Wang Yang (born 23 January 1993), former name Chen Xiaohan, is a Chinese footballer who plays as a defender for Zhejiang Professional.

Club career
In 2014, Wang Yang (Chen Xiaohan) started his professional footballer career with Hangzhou Greentown in the Chinese Super League. On 2 November 2014, Wang made his debut for Hangzhou Greentown in the 2014 Chinese Super League against Changchun Yatai, coming on as a substitute for Zang Yifeng in the 90th minute.
In March 2015, Wang was loaned to China League Two side Baotou Nanjiao until 31 December 2015. On his return to his parent club now renamed Zhejiang Professional, he start to establish himself as a regular within the team as the club gained promotion to the top tier at the end of the 2021 campaign.

Career statistics

Statistics accurate as of match played 31 January 2023.

References

External links
 

1993 births
Living people
Footballers from Hebei
Sportspeople from Baoding
Zhejiang Professional F.C. players
Chinese Super League players
China League One players
China League Two players
Association football defenders
Chinese footballers
21st-century Chinese people